Diego Pablo Sevilla López (born 4 March 1996) is a Spanish racing cyclist, who currently rides for UCI ProTeam .

Major results

2016
 1st Stage 3 Tour of Galicia
2017
 3rd Road race, National Under-23 Road Championships
2018
 1st  Mountains classification, Tour La Provence
 4th Overall International Tour of Rhodes
2022
 1st  Sprints classification Vuelta a Andalucía

References

External links

1996 births
Living people
Spanish male cyclists
Cyclists from the Community of Madrid